The Bikol languages or Bicolano languages are a group of Central Philippine languages spoken mostly in the Bicol Peninsula in the island of Luzon, the neighboring island province of Catanduanes and the island of Burias in Masbate.

Internal classification

Ethnologue

Ethnologue groups the languages of Bikol as follows:
Coastal Bikol (Northern)
Isarog Agta language
Mount Iraya Agta language
Central Bikol language
Canaman dialect (standard)
Naga City dialect
Partido dialect
Tabaco–Legazpi–Sorsogon (TLS) dialect
Daet dialect
Southern Catanduanes Bikol language
Inland Bikol (Southern)
Mount Iriga Agta language
Albay Bikol languages
Buhinon language
Libon language
West Miraya language
East Miraya language
Rinconada Bikol language
Highland/Sinabukid dialect
Agta variant
Iriga variant (standard)
Lakeside/Sinaranəw dialect
Baao variant
Bato variant
Bula–Pili variant
Nabua–Balatan variant
Northern Catanduanes Bikol (Pandan Bikol)

McFarland (1974)
Curtis McFarland gives the following classification for the Bikol languages.

Lobel (2000)

While McFarland (1974) splits Bikol into 11 dialects, Lobel (2000) splits Bikol into 12 different dialects (including Partido Bikol, which McFarland does not differentiate) and 4 main branches.
 Northern Coastal Bikol
 Central Standard – spoken primarily in Naga City, Cam. Sur, Tabaco & Legazpi, Albay and Sorsogon City, Sorsogon. Also recognized (and sometimes understood) in Daet, Camarines Norte and many other areas of Camarines Sur, San Pascual, Masbate on Burias Island, first and second districts of Albay, southwestern coast of Catanduanes, and northeastern Sorsogon.
 Daet area variant
 Naga City area variant
 Tabaco–Legazpi–Sorsogon area variant
 Southwestern and northern town of San Andres and Caramoran, Catanduanes.
 Partido – spoken in the Camarines Sur municipalities of Ocampo, Goa, Tigaon, Lagonoy, Sagñay, and San Jose. This dialect has a mellow intonation and is heavily influenced by Rinconada Bikol.
 Southern Catanduanes – spoken in the southern half of Catanduanes.
 Virac area variant
 Bato area variant
 Baras area variant
 San Miguel variant (transitional to North Catanduanes)
 Southern Coastal and Inland Bikol
 Rinconada Bikol – spoken primarily in Iriga City, Baao, Bula, Balatan, Baao and Nabua, Camarines Sur. Also in some parts of Ocampo, Buhi and Pili in Camarines Sur and in parts of Polangui, Albay.
 Lakeside Rinconada dialect (lacks /ə/ vowel)
 Highland Rinconada dialect (with /ə/ vowel)
 Buhinon – spoken in Buhi, Camarines Sur. Contains features from both the Bikol of Polangui, Albay and the Iriga variant of Rinconada Bikol.
 Libon – spoken in Libon, Albay.
 West Miraya – spoken in Ligao City, Polangui, Oas, and Pio Duran, Albay.
 East Miraya – spoken in Guinobatan, Camalig, Daraga & Jovellar, Albay and Donsol & Pilar, Sorsogon.
 Central (Guinobatan)
 Far East (Camalig, Daraga)
 Southeast (Jovellar, Albay, Donsol, Pilar)
 Northern Catanduanes 
 Pandan Bikol – spoken by about 80,000 people or the northern half of Catanduanes.
 Bagamanoc area variant
 Caramoran area variant (transitional to South Catanduanes)
 Gigmoto area variant (transitional to South Catanduanes)
 Pandan area variant
 Panganiban area variant
 Viga area variant
 Bisakol
 Northern Sorsogon – spoken in Sorsogon City, Castilla, Casiguran and Juban.
 Castilla area variant (mixed with Bikol-Legazpi)
 Casiguran–Juban area variant
 Southern Sorsogon (also known as Gubat language) – spoken in Gubat; Barcelona, Bulusan, Santa Magdalena, Matnog, Irosin, and Bulan.
 Masbateño – spoken in Masbate City, Mobo, Uson, Dimasalang, Palanas, Masbate, Aroroy on the island of Masbate, all of Ticao Island, and Claveria on the southern half of Burias Island.
 Standard Masbateño
 Ticao Island variant

Some dialects of Southern Bikol have the close central unrounded vowel  as a reflex of Proto-Austronesian . Two Bikol dialects have unique additional consonants, namely Southern Catanduanes, which has an interdental lateral consonant  (also transcribed as ), and Buhi-non, which has the voiced velar fricative .

See also
Vocabulario de la lengua Bicol

References

Sources

External links

 Translate Bikol, an online English–Bikol and Bisakol languages translator.
 A Bikol language database is available through the Kaipuleohone archive.

 
Central Philippine languages
Languages of the Philippines
Bicolano